Plassey (now Palasi) is a town in West Bengal, India

It can also refer to:
 Battle of Plassey, fought there in 1757 during the Seven Years War
 Plassey railway station, a stop near the town/Palasi on Indian Railways
 Plassey College, a general degree college in Palasi
 Plassey, County Clare, the estate of Robert Clive, victor of the battle
 Plassey, County Limerick, also named for the battle
 MV Plassey, a freighter named for the locations in Ireland

See also
Plessey (disambiguation)